Claude Mylon (1618–1660) was a French mathematician and member of the Académie Parisienne and the Académie des Sciences.

References

French mathematicians
1618 births
1660 deaths
Scientists from Paris